Mohammad Taqi Beyg (also Romanized as Moḩammad Taqī Beyg; also known as Dorūngar, Duringār, and Moḩammad Taqī Bag) is a village in Dorungar Rural District, Now Khandan District, Dargaz County, Razavi Khorasan Province, Iran. At the 2006 census, its population was 608, in 172 families.

References 

Populated places in Dargaz County